The 2015 Rugby Europe Women's Sevens Grand Prix Series was held over two legs in the cities of Kazan and Brive. France won the championship and qualified for the women's rugby sevens at the 2016 Summer Olympics. Russia finished second and qualified the 2016 Rugby World Women's Sevens Olympic Repechage Tournament. A further seven teams qualified for the 2015 Rugby Europe Women's Sevens Olympic Repechage Tournament.

Series

Teams

Kazan leg

Pool stage

Pool A

Pool B

Pool C

Knockout stage

Bowl

Plate

Cup

Brive leg

Pool stage

Pool A

Pool B

Pool C

Knockout stage

Bowl

Plate

Cup

Grand Prix standings

See also
 2015 Rugby Europe Men's Sevens Championships

References

External links
Rugby Europe website

  
2015
Rugby sevens at the 2016 Summer Olympics – Women's tournament
Sevens
2015 rugby sevens competitions
International women's rugby union competitions hosted by France
International women's rugby union competitions hosted by Russia
2015 in French women's sport
2015 in Russian women's sport
2015 in Russian rugby union
2014–15 in French rugby union